Central Norway Pharmaceutical Trust is a health trust owned by Central Norway Regional Health Authority that operates four hospital pharmacies at St. Olavs Hospital in Trondheim, Kristiansund Hospital, Molde Hospital and Ålesund Hospital. The pharmacies are part of the Ditt Apotek chain and use Norsk Medisinaldepot as wholesaler. The hospitals in Levanger, Namsos and Orkanger do not use the trust for their pharmacies.

References

Pharmacies of Norway
Retail companies of Norway
Health trusts of Norway
Retail companies established in 2002
Companies based in Trondheim
2002 establishments in Norway